Bazaria turensis is a species of snout moth in the genus Bazaria. It was described by Ragonot, in 1887.  It is found in Kazakhstan, Tunisia, Algeria, Mauritania, Iran, Armenia, Russia and central China, Asia.

The wingspan is about 17 mm.

The larvae have been recorded feeding on Nitraria roborowskii. They roll the leaves of their host plant.

References

Phycitini
Moths described in 1887
Moths of Asia
Moths of Africa
Taxa named by Émile Louis Ragonot